Veit Harlan (22 September 1899 – 13 April 1964) was a German film director and actor. Harlan reached the highpoint of his career as a director in the Nazi era; most notably his antisemitic film Jud Süß (1940) makes him controversial. While viewed critically for his ideologies, a number of critics consider him a capable director on the grounds of such work as his Opfergang (1944).

Life and career
Harlan was born in Berlin, the son of the writer Walter Harlan and his wife Adele, nee Boothby. His elder brother Peter was a multi-instrumentalist and musical instrument maker. After studying under Max Reinhardt, he first appeared on the stage in 1915 and, after World War I, worked in the Berlin stage. In 1934 he starred in the Berlin premiere of Eugen Ortner's tragedy Meier Helmbrecht, but it was a critical disaster and he later described it as his lowest point as an actor. Shortly afterwards he directed his first play, the comedy Marriage on the Panke, at the Theater am Schiffbauerdamm.

In 1922 he married Jewish actress and cabaret singer Dora Gerson; the couple divorced in 1924. Gerson later was murdered at Auschwitz with her family. In 1929, he married Hilde Körber, having three children with her, then divorcing her for political reasons related to the influence of Nazism. One of their children, Thomas Harlan, became a writer and director in his own right. In 1939, Veit Harlan married the Swedish actress Kristina Söderbaum, for whom he wrote several tragic roles that included dramatic suicide scenes, increasing their popularity with the German cinema audience. Harlan had two children with Söderbaum.

Nazi era
Film critic David Thomson asserts that Harlan, having just started directing in 1935, was able to attract Goebbels' attention only because so much directorial talent had emigrated from Germany after the Nazis had taken power. By 1937, Joseph Goebbels had appointed Harlan as one of his leading propaganda directors. His most notorious film was Jud Süß (1940), made for anti-Semitic propaganda purposes in Germany and Austria. In 1943 it received UFA's highest awards. Karsten Witte, the film critic, provided a fitting appellation for Harlan calling him "the baroque fascist". Harlan made the Reich's loudest, most colorful and expensive films.

Postwar
After the war Harlan was charged with participating in the anti-Semitic movement and aiding the Nazis. However, he successfully defended himself by arguing that the Nazis controlled his work, that he was obeying their orders, and that he should not be held personally responsible for the content. There was no proof shown that backed this; on the contrary, it was said that it was well-known that Harlan made his works more antisemitic than the regime had asked—for example, a script for Jud Süß into which Harlan put more antisemitic messages was praised by Goebbels. In 1949, Harlan was charged with crimes against humanity for his role as director of Jud Süß. The Hamburg Criminal Chamber of the Regional Court (Schwurgericht) controversially acquitted Harlan of the charges. This decision was upheld by the court of the British occupation zone. Both acquittals remain controversial to this day since the ruling judge had previously worked as a judge for the Nazi regime and since Harlan's works had been proven to have contributed hugely to spreading the antisemitic sentiment in Germany, which enabled the Holocaust. Nazi camp guards who watched Jud Süß, Jewish survivors told the court, had become more cruel towards inmates afterwards, clearly affected by the propaganda contents which made them hate Jews more (although this allegation could not be proved). The film was deemed in one court to be unsuitable and highly problematic and to have contributed to enabling the antisemitism and genocides, but neither Harlan or his antisemitic supporters who insulted Jewish victims in the courts were ever sentenced.

In 1951, Harlan sued for an injunction against Hamburg politician Erich Lüth for publicly calling for a boycott of Unsterbliche Geliebte (Immortal Beloved). The District Court in Hamburg granted Harlan's suit and ordered that Lüth forbear from making such public appeals. However, the lower court decision was overturned in 1958 by the Federal Constitutional Court because it infringed on Lüth's right to freedom of expression. This was a landmark decision because it clarified the importance of the constitutional civil rights in disputes between individuals.

Harlan made a total of nine films between 1950 and 1958. He died in 1964 while on vacation in Capri.

Family
Veit Harlan's son Thomas (1929–2010), an author and film director, created a semi-documentary film titled Wundkanal (Wound Passage), in which his father, played by a convicted mass murderer, is forced to undergo a series of brutal interrogations into his war crimes. Thomas Harlan's final publication, issued posthumously, Veit, was a memoir in the form of a letter to his father, continuing the investigation into Veit Harlan's complicity in the Nazi regime.

In 1958, Veit Harlan's niece Christiane Susanne Harlan married filmmaker Stanley Kubrick, who was Jewish. She is credited by her stage name Susanne Christian in Kubrick's Paths of Glory (1957). She said she was ashamed to come from a "family of murderers" but was relieved that Kubrick's Jewish family accepted her despite her ties to Harlan. They remained married until Stanley Kubrick's death in 1999.

Susanne Körber, one of his daughters from his second wife Hilde Körber, converted to Judaism and married the son of Holocaust victims. She committed suicide in 1989.

Documentaries

In 2001,  made a film titled Jud Süß – Ein Film als Verbrechen? (Jud Süß – A Film as a Crime?).

The documentary Harlan – In the Shadow of Jew Süss (2008) by Felix Moeller explores Harlan's motivations and the post-war reaction of his children and grandchildren to his notoriety.

Filmography

Actor

 The Master of Nuremberg (1927) as David
 The Trousers (1927) as Mandelstam
 One Plus One Equals Three (1927) as Paul
 The Girl with the Five Zeros (1927) as Ernst Waldt
 Somnambul (1929) as Kurt Bingen
 Hungarian Nights (1929) as Zoltan
 Revolt in the Reformatory (1929) as Kurt
 A Woman Branded (1931) as the student
 Alarm at Midnight (1931) as Otto Weigandt
 The Eleven Schill Officers (1932) as Klaus Gabain
 Frederica (1932) as Duke Karl August von Weimar
 The Invisible Front (1933) as Friseur Jonny
 The Hymn of Leuthen (1933) as Paul the soldier
 Typhoon (1933) as Inose Hironari
 Paganini (1934) as Enrico Tortoni
 A Woman With Power of Attorney (1934) as Schwartzkopf
 The Brenken Case (1934) as the stranger
 My Life for Maria Isabella (1935) as the rebel corporal
 Don't Lose Heart, Suzanne! (1935) as Georg Brinkmann
 The Red Rider (1935) as Andreas
 Joan of Arc (1935) as Pierre
 Stradivari (1935) as Antonio Stradivari
 Stars Over Colombo (1953) as the clown

Director

 Die Pompadour (1935)
 Trouble Backstairs (1935)
 Kater Lampe (1936)
 Fräulein Veronika (1936)
 Maria the Maid (1936)
 Tired Theodore (1936)
 The Kreutzer Sonata (1937)
 My Son the Minister (1937)
 The Ruler (1937)
  (1938)
 Covered Tracks (1938)
 The Immortal Heart (1939)
 The Journey to Tilsit (1939)
 Jud Süß (1940)
 The Great King (1941)
 Pedro Will Hang (1941)
 Die goldene Stadt (1942)
 Immensee (1943)
 Opfergang (1944)
 Kolberg (1945)
 Immortal Beloved (1950)
 Hanna Amon (1951)
 The Blue Hour (1953)
 Stars Over Colombo (1953)
 The Prisoner of the Maharaja (1954)
  (1954)
 Different from You and Me 
 I'll Carry You in My Arms (1958)
  (1958)
 Es war die erste Liebe (1958)

Screenwriter only
  (1945)
 Eyes of Love (1951)

See also 
List of films made in the Third Reich
Nazism and cinema

Further reading
Veit Harlan: The Life and Work of a Nazi Filmmaker by Frank Noack, 2016, University Press of Kentucky.

References

External links

Photographs of Veit Harlan

1899 births
1964 deaths
Film directors from Berlin
Nazi propagandists
Propaganda film directors